Gabriola minima is a species of geometrid moth in the family Geometridae. It is found in North America.

The MONA or Hodges number for Gabriola minima is 6783.

References

Further reading

 

Nacophorini
Articles created by Qbugbot
Moths described in 1896